The Luachimo Hydroelectric Power Station is a hydroelectric power plant near Luachimo in northeast Angola, close to the border with the Democratic Republic of the Congo .

Location
The power station is located across the Luachimo River, in the commune of Luachimo, in the Lunda Norte Province of Angola, adjacent to the international border with the Democratic Republic of the Congo. The geographical coordinates of Luachimo Hydroelectric Power Station are:07°21'47.0"S, 20°50'36.0"E (Latitude:-7.363056; Longitude:20.843333).

Overview
Construction of the original power station at this site, started in 1953. The power station is owned and operated by Empresa Nacional de Diamantes de Angola.

Rehabilitation and expansion
Plans to rehabilitate and expand this power station have been in the works since 2009, wen Emanuela Vieira Lopes, the country's 
minister of Energy, made those plans public.

In 2016 work began at the power station, to increase generation capacity from 8.4 megawatts to 34 megawatts. Each new turbine will have generation capacity of 8.5 megawatts. The power generated will supply the 186,000 people who live in Dundo City and surrounding neighborhoods. The renovations and upgrade to the power station cost US$212 million.

See also

 List of power stations in Angola

References

External links
 Power Generation in Angola As of 3 January 2020.

1957 establishments in Angola
Dams in Angola
Underground power stations
Energy infrastructure completed in 1957
Hydroelectric power stations in Angola
Dams completed in 1957
Lunda Norte Province
Dundo